"The Night Before" is a song by the English rock band the Beatles from their 1965 film Help! and soundtrack album of the same name. It was written primarily by Paul McCartney and credited to the Lennon–McCartney partnership. McCartney considered it one of his favorite songs from the film. The song's film sequence features the band miming the song on Salisbury Plain, near Stonehenge.

Background and composition
Neither Paul McCartney nor John Lennon had strong memories about writing "The Night Before". Although the song is credited to the Lennon–McCartney songwriting partnership, both identified it as being written primarily by McCartney. McCartney recalled writing it at the apartment of his then girlfriend Jane Asher and her family, at 57 Wimpole Street in central London.

"The Night Before" has been described as a pop rock, pop, or rock and roll song that also draws from blues, R&B, and Motown. It is mainly in the key of D major, with a brief modulation to G major in the bridge, and is in 4/4 time. Structurally, musicologist Alan W. Pollack writes that the song uses a "standard long form", containing two bridges and two verse sections, with one being partly used for the guitar solo. The verse melody is shared between the lead and backing vocal parts, similar to a hocket, which biographer Jonathan Gould says prefigures the "increasingly complex and conversational" vocal arrangements in the Beatles' later songs. In the opinion of musicologist Walter Everett, had the Beatles recorded "The Night Before" at a slower tempo, it "could have been a Kinks or Animals song".

The lyrics of "The Night Before" are from the perspective of someone whose lover has left them overnight, leaving them remembering their last time together. Music journalist Steve Turner says that this may have been inspired by McCartney's tumultuous relationship with Asher. Pollack writes that the song is comparable to another McCartney-penned Help! track, "Yesterday", in that both protagonists want to reverse their relationships by one day; however, while "Yesterday" expresses "grim resignation", "The Night Before" "openly begs for another chance." Writer Kevin Courrier compares the song with a contemporaneous song by Lennon, "Yes It Is", noting that "where Lennon wishes to rid himself of memories of loss ... McCartney wants to hold on to the happy thoughts of the night before, even if it means he's being abandoned."

Recording 
The Beatles recorded "The Night Before" and George Harrison's "You Like Me Too Much" on 17 February 1965, during the third session devoted to the soundtrack of their second feature film Help! Recorded in EMI's Studio Two, George Martin produced the session, assisted by engineers Norman Smith and Ken Scott. The band achieved a satisfactory basic track in two takes, featuring McCartney singing and playing bass, Ringo Starr on drums, Harrison playing rhythm guitar on his Gretsch Tennessean, and Lennon playing a Hohner Pianet electric piano, the first time the instrument was used on a Beatles recording.

The band overdubbed several parts onto take two. McCartney double-tracked his vocal, Lennon and Harrison added backing vocals, Starr added maracas to the bridge, and McCartney and Harrison – the former of whom using his new Epiphone Casino – played a dual guitar solo, doubling each other at the octave. McCartney was pleased with the final recording, telling Melody Maker, "that sound was one of the best [we] had got on record, instrumentally."

On 18 February 1965, Martin, Smith, and Scott mixed the song for mono in the control room of Studio Two. Smith and engineer Malcolm Davies remixed it for stereo on 23 February. On 18 April in EMI's Room 65, another stereo remix was made by Martin, Smith, and Phil McDonald for the film company United Artists, but it was never used.

Film sequence

"The Night Before" was one of six songs selected by director Richard Lester for use in Help! The song's film sequence was shot over 3–5 May 1965 and consists of the band miming to the track on Salisbury Plain, where Stonehenge is located. The scene depicts an outdoor recording session, with a makeshift control booth and recording equipment set up in an open field. Further to the film's premise of Starr being targeted for assassination by a cult, the Beatles perform the song under protection of the British 3rd Royal Tank Regiment, surrounded by soldiers and Centurion tanks. "She's a Woman" is also featured in the sequence, interspersing the performance with respect to the film's action. As "The Night Before" finishes, dynamite explodes and the band runs for cover.

Release and reception 
Help! premiered in the United Kingdom on 29 July 1965, and EMI's Parlophone label released the soundtrack LP on 6 August. "The Night Before" appeared on side one along with the six other tracks used in the film, sequenced between "Help!" and "You've Got to Hide Your Love Away". On 13 August, Capitol released the North American version of the album, with the song sequenced between "Help!" and "From Me To You Fantasy" from Ken Thorne's score. In a contemporary interview, McCartney said that "The Night Before" was one of his favorite songs from the film and that the band struggled deciding whether it or "Ticket to Ride" should have been the lead single.

Among Beatles biographers, Hunter Davies considers "The Night Before" to be a "middling song" that "critics have had little to say about, not seeing much to praise, or much to attack". Ian MacDonald was critical of the song, writing in his book Revolution in the Head, "[n]othing surprising happens in the harmony, the lyrics are weak, and the track as a whole is only fair mainstream pop of its period." Tim Riley calls it "a piece of formula pop" with "nothing as rich harmonically as 'Another Girl' on [side one of Help!] nor as precocious as 'Yesterday' on side two." Authors Patrick Humphries and Peter Doggett deem Lennon's electric piano playing to be the only novel element of the song. Conversely, Richie Unterberger of AllMusic calls the track "a first-rate romantic pop-rock song" and cites it as an example of McCartney "excell[ing] at haunting melodies". In 2010, Rolling Stone ranked "The Night Before" at number 49 in a list of the Beatles' 100 greatest songs, and a 2014 readers' poll conducted by the magazine ranked it as the ninth best Beatles song from the pre-Rubber Soul era.

Other versions 
British law in the 1960s compelled BBC Radio to play material recorded especially for the medium. In keeping with this practice, the Beatles played "The Night Before" for the BBC Light Programme The Beatles (Invite You to Take a Ticket to Ride) on 26 May 1965. This would be the group's only live rendition of the song in their entire career. Broadcast on 7 June, the performance was their final music programme contribution, as they no longer had the desire or need to record sessions exclusively for the BBC. It was also their only BBC session to feature electric piano, used on "The Night Before" and "Dizzy Miss Lizzy". Of the songs performed during this session, EMI only included "Dizzy Miss Lizzy" and "Ticket to Ride" on the 1994 album Live at the BBC, although the entire broadcast has appeared on bootlegs.

George Martin included "The Night Before" on his 1965 album, also titled Help!, which contains instrumental versions of Beatles songs. American jazz flautist Herbie Mann recorded cover versions of "The Night Before" and "Yesterday" for his 1966 album Today! New wave singer Josie Cotton recorded a cover of "The Night Before" in 1986 – featuring vocals from Stray Cats guitarist Brian Setzer – for her album Everything Is Oh Yeah, which went unreleased until 2019. Country band Restless Heart covered the song for their 2004 reunion album Still Restless, with music critic Al Campbell writing that it "sounds more like mid-'70s America than the Fab Four."

McCartney performed "The Night Before" in concert for the first time on 15 July 2011 at Yankee Stadium, the first show of his 2011-12 On the Run tour.

Personnel
According to Ian MacDonald unless stated otherwise:
Paul McCartney – double-tracked lead vocals, bass, lead guitar
John Lennon – electric piano, harmony vocals
George Harrison – rhythm guitar, lead guitar, harmony vocals
Ringo Starr – drums, maracas

References

Bibliography

External links 

 Full lyrics for the song at the Beatles' official website
 

The Beatles songs
Song recordings produced by George Martin
Restless Heart songs
Songs written for films
Songs written by Lennon–McCartney
Songs published by Northern Songs
1965 songs
British pop rock songs
Songs about nights